Mathew Vincent Perera (21 September 1918 - 7 April 1993) was a Sri Lankan statesman. He served in multiple cabinet positions and government posts. Perera was also Mayor of Colombo twice.

Perera was one of the wounded in the 1987 grenade attack in the Sri Lankan Parliament.

References

External links
Perera, Mathew Vincent
Chief Government Whips

Justice ministers of Sri Lanka
1918 births
1993 deaths
Sri Lankan Roman Catholics
Chief Government Whips (Sri Lanka)